Val-Royal or variation, may refer to:

 Val Royal (1996–2008), a French thoroughbred racehorse
 Groupe Val-Royal, the parent company of renovation centre chain Réno-Dépôt
 Val-Royal station, the former name of the commuter rail station Bois-Franc station

See also

Royal (disambiguation)
Val (disambiguation)
Valreale, an alternate name for Brajičić, Croatia; see List of Italian exonyms in Dalmatia
Vale Royal (disambiguation)
Royal Valley (disambiguation)
Royal Gorge (disambiguation)